The calcaneocuboid joint is the joint between the calcaneus and the cuboid bone.

Structure 
The calcaneocuboid joint is a type of saddle joint between the calcaneus and the cuboid bone.

Ligaments 
There are five ligaments connecting the calcaneus and the cuboid bone, forming parts of the articular capsule:
 the dorsal calcaneocuboid ligament.
 part of the bifurcated ligament.
 the long plantar ligament.
 and the plantar calcaneocuboid ligament.

Function 
The calcaneocuboid joint is conventionally described as among the least mobile joints in the human foot. The articular surfaces of the two bones are relatively flat with some irregular undulations, which seem to suggest movement limited to a single rotation and some translation. However, the cuboid rotates as much as 25° about an oblique axis during inversion-eversion in a movement that could be called involution.

Clinical significance 
The calcaneocuboid joint may be affected by a calcaneal fracture. This may be a sign of a worse fracture, associated with worse outcomes (such as osteoarthritis) after treatment.

References

External links 
 

Foot
Skeletal system